The Biman Bangladesh Airlines cricket team was a first-class cricket team in Bangladesh that played in only the inaugural 2000–01 domestic season and won the National Cricket League title. The team was sponsored by Biman Bangladesh Airlines, the government-owned airliner of Bangladesh.

The club played its home games at the Bangladesh Krira Shikkha Protisthan No 1 Ground in Savar.

Biman Bangladesh Airlines currently play among the 12 clubs in the Dhaka Metropolis Premier League which is not given first class status. Biman also sponsors a team in the Corporate Cricket League.

The team signed 18-year-old Pakistani opening batsman Imran Farhat during the 2000–01 season, and Farhat dominated, scoring 216 in the first match of the season and ending up with the most runs in Bangladeshi first class cricket that season. However, Habibul Bashar had the highest first class score for the team, with 224.

Honours
 National Cricket League (1) – 2000–01

First-class statistics

References 
 Wisden Cricketers' Almanack (annual)

Further references and notes

External links
 Tournaments in Bangladesh since 1972–73 at CricketArchive
 "A brief history of Bangladesh domestic cricket" at Cricinfo

Bangladeshi first-class cricket teams
Biman Bangladesh Airlines
Bangladesh National Cricket League
1976 establishments in Bangladesh
Cricket clubs established in 1976